Ronald James Sider (September 17, 1939 – July 27, 2022), was a Canadian-born American theologian and social activist. He was the founder of Evangelicals for Social Action, a think-tank which seeks to develop biblical solutions to social and economic problems through incubating programs that operate at the intersection of faith and social justice. 

Sider was also a founding board member of the National Religious Partnership for the Environment. He was the Distinguished Professor of Theology, Holistic Ministry and Public Policy at Palmer Theological Seminary in St. Davids, Pennsylvania.

Education and career
Sider attended the Waterloo Lutheran University, in Waterloo, Ontario, and received a BA in European history in 1962. While at Waterloo, he came in contact with the apologetic work of InterVarsity Christian Fellowship, and set his sights on a career in academia. Upon graduating from Yale University with an M.A. (history, 1963), B.D. (divinity, 1967), and PhD (history, 1969), he expected to teach early modern European history on secular university campuses, and continue his apologetic work for IVCF. In 1968, he accepted an invitation from Messiah College to teach at its newly opened Philadelphia Campus in the inner city of Philadelphia, Pennsylvania. The racism, poverty, and evangelical indifference he observed at close hand made a deep impression that led him to write the book, Rich Christians in an Age of Hunger.

What he saw as the injustice of the inner city motivated Sider to work toward developing a biblical response to social injustice. He brought together a network of similarly concerned evangelicals, which in 1973 became the Thanksgiving Workshop on Evangelical Social Concern. It was this conference that issued The Chicago Declaration of Evangelical Social Concern. Twenty years later, a similar gathering of evangelical leaders resulted in the Chicago Declaration II: A Call for Evangelical Renewal. In 2004 he was a signatory of the "Confessing Christ in a World of Violence" document.

He signed his name to a full-page ad in the 5 December 2008 New York Times that objected to violence and intimidation against religious institutions and believers in the wake of the passage of Proposition 8. The ad stated that "violence and intimidation are always wrong, whether the victims are believers, gay people, or anyone else." A dozen other religious and human rights activists from several different faiths also signed the ad, noting that they "differ on important moral and legal questions," including Proposition 8.

Publications
Sider published over 30 books and wrote over 100 articles in both religious and secular magazines on a variety of topics including the importance of caring for creation as part of biblical discipleship.

In 1977, Sider's Rich Christians in an Age of Hunger, was published. Hailed by Christianity Today as one of the one hundred most influential books in religion in the 20th century, it went on to sell over 400,000 copies in many languages. He later authored Good News Good Works (published by Baker Book House), a call to the church to embrace what Sider sees as the whole gospel, through a combination of evangelism, social engagement and spiritual formation. Its companion book tells stories about effective ministries that bring both evangelism and social transformation together.

Completely Pro-Life, published in the mid-1980s, calls on Christians to take a consistent stand opposing abortion, capital punishment, nuclear weapons, hunger, and other conditions that Sider sees as anti-life. Cup of Water, Bread of Life was published in 1994. Living Like Jesus (1999) has been called Sider's Mere Christianity. Just Generosity: A New Vision for Overcoming Poverty in America (1999, 2007) offers a holistic, comprehensive vision for dramatically reducing America's poverty.  Churches That Make a Difference (2002) with Phil Olson and Heidi Rolland Unruh provides concrete help to local congregations seeking to combine evangelism and social ministry. Recent publications include: Fixing the Moral Deficit: A Balanced Way to Balance the Budget (2012); Just Politics: A Guide for Christian Engagement (2012); The Early Church on Killing: A Comprehensive Sourcebook on War, Abortion, and Capital Punishment (2012); The Spiritual Danger of Donald Trump: 30 Evangelical Christians on Justice, Truth, and Moral Integrity (2020).

Ecumenical relations
In August 2009, he signed a public statement encouraging all Christians to read, wrestle with, and respond to Caritas in Veritate, the social encyclical by Pope Benedict XVI. Later that year, he also gave his approval to the Manhattan Declaration, calling on evangelicals, Catholics and Orthodox not to comply with rules and laws permitting abortion, same-sex marriage and other matters that go against their religious consciences.

Criticism
Sider's opponents typically criticize his ideas as consisting of bad theology and bad economics. The most thorough critiques come from the American Christian right, specifically from Christian Reconstructionists. David Chilton's book, Productive Christians in an Age of Guilt Manipulators (1986), with a foreword by Gary North, argues that Sider's book takes a position contrary to the biblical teachings on economics, poverty, and giving, and that the economic model it provides is untenable. Sider significantly revised the book for the twentieth anniversary edition, and, in an interview with Christianity Today magazine said, "I admit, though, that I didn't know a great deal of economics when I wrote the first edition of Rich Christians. In the meantime, I've learned considerably more, and I've changed some things as a result of that. For example, in the new, twentieth-anniversary edition, I say more explicitly that when the choice is democratic capitalism or communism, I favor the democratic political order and market economies."

Family
Sider was the child of a Canadian Brethren in Christ pastor. He attended Oxford Circle Mennonite Church, was the father of three and lived in Lansdale, Pennsylvania, with his wife Arbutus, a retired family counselor. They celebrated their 50th wedding anniversary in 2011, and they had six granddaughters. Sider's son Theodore (Ted) is a tenured professor of philosophy at Rutgers who has published over 50 scholarly articles and three books with Oxford University Press.

See also
 List of University of Waterloo people

References

External links

Obituary with Details
Evangelicals for Social Action
The Sider Center for Ministry and Public Policy

Oxford Circle Mennonite Church

1939 births
2022 deaths
20th-century American male writers
20th-century evangelicals
21st-century American male writers
21st-century evangelicals
American Christian pacifists
American consistent life ethics activists
American evangelicals
Canadian Christian pacifists
Canadian evangelicals
Canadian Mennonites
Evangelical theologians
Mennonite writers
Messiah University
Palmer Theological Seminary
People from Fort Erie, Ontario
Religion and politics
University of Waterloo alumni
Yale Divinity School alumni